Alberto Fontana (born 14 June 1990 in Turin) known professionally as Alberto Naska is an Italian racing driver, YouTuber and Internet personality that currently competes in the NASCAR Whelen Euro Series, driving the No. 88 Chevrolet Camaro for CAAL Racing in the EuroNASCAR 2 championship.

Racing career
Alberto Naska debuted in 2006 as a virtual racer and won a championship in 2007 year. As a reward he received the possibility of driving a Formula Renault 2000 Lite on track.

In 2012 Naska took part at the Swiss racing reality show Make it Your Race, organized by Abarth and won the Abarth Benelux Trophy in 2013.

In 2018 Alberto Naska began his amateur motorcycle racing career in the Trofeo Motoestate in the Race Attack 1000 division where he ended up 5th, he won the title in 2019 but in 2020 an ankle injury terminated his motorcycle career.
Also in 2018 he started his formula racing career in the FormulaX Italian Series championship Formula Predator where he raced until 2021.
From 2021 he also raced in the Legend Cars Italia series where he ended 2nd in both the 2021 and 2022 season.

In 2022 he announced he would race in the NASCAR Whelen Euro Series with the CAAL Racing's number 88 car for that season in the Euronascar 2 division. Naska finished his debut season with five wins and a 2nd place overall both in the rookie and in the general standings.

Personal life
Naska graduated in 2012 at the Polytechnic University of Turin as computer engineer and moved to Milan the next year where he opened a racing social network and worked as videomaker. In 2016 Naska opened his YouTube channel that today counts over 800'000 followers. In his channel he makes blogs about his racing career and other experiences outside motorsport.

In 2020 Naska published his autobiographical book "Fino all'ultima curva".

Racing results

NASCAR

Whelen Euro Series - EuroNASCAR 2
(key) Bold - Pole position awarded by fastest qualifying time (in Race 1) or by previous race's fastest lap (in Race 2). Italics - Fastest lap. * – Most laps led.  ^ – Most positions gained.)

Awards
2013 Abarth Benelux Trophy Champion
2019 Race Attack 1000 Champion
2021 Legend Cars Italia Runner-up
2021 Formula Predator Runner-up
2022 Legend Cars Italia Runner-up
2022 Euronascar 2 Runner-up

Notes

References

1990 births
Living people
Italian YouTubers
Italian racing drivers
Racing drivers from Turin
NASCAR drivers